Lynn Schneider is an American politician serving as a member of the South Dakota House of Representatives from the 22nd district. He was appointed to the House by Governor Kristi Noem on May 8, 2020, succeeding Bob Glanzer.

Early life and education 
Schneider was born and raised on a farm in rural Beadle County, South Dakota. After graduating from Huron High School, he earned a Bachelor of Arts degree in economics and business from Huron University.

Career 
Schneider served in the United States Army during the Vietnam War in 1970 and 1971. He then worked in the banking industry for 41 years, including as CEO of F&M Marquette Bank and American Bank & Trust. He was appointed to the South Dakota House of Representatives by Governor Kristi Noem on May 8, 2020, succeeding Bob Glanzer.

References 

Living people
People from Beadle County, South Dakota
Huron University alumni
American bankers
Republican Party members of the South Dakota House of Representatives
Year of birth missing (living people)